James Edward "Pop" Pough (February 16, 1948 – June 18, 1990) was an American spree killer who killed thirteen people in two separate attacks in Jacksonville, Florida on 17 and 18 June 1990. Pough shot and killed two people at random on Jacksonville’s Northside, wounded two teenagers, and robbed a convenience store. Pough shot and killed nine people and wounded four others at a General Motors Acceptance Corporation (now Ally Financial) car loan office the next day before committing suicide.

At the time, the shooting at the GMAC office was the deadliest single mass shooting committed by a lone gunman in Florida history, surpassing the murder of eight machine shop employees in Hialeah by Carl Robert Brown on August 20, 1982.

Early life
James Edward Pough was born on February 16, 1948, in Jacksonville, Florida, the first of nine children. Pough grew up in an area near Florida Community College at Jacksonville. As a child, Pough suffered from asthma and he had a close relationship with his mother, whom he helped out a lot after his father left the family in 1959. He attended a vocational school, but dropped out in his sophomore year. At the age of 18, he began working as a common laborer, which he remained as until his death. During the last year of his life, he was doing construction maintenance at a brewery.

According to former schoolmates, Pough had affiliations with street gangs during his time at school. He was arrested twice in 1965 for vagrancy, and twice again in 1966, once for attempted robbery and a second time for assault after he attacked a construction worker who owed him a quarter. In 1968, Pough was arrested for dangerously displaying a knife and was fined $75, and in July 1969, he was fined $10 after being charged for gambling. In 1970, he was arrested, but not prosecuted, for motor vehicle theft and vagrancy-prowling by auto.

1971 murder of David Lee Pender
On May 8, 1971, Pough got into an argument with his best friend, David Lee Pender, who had called his girlfriend a "bitch". In the following scuffle, Pough grabbed a .38-caliber revolver from his girlfriend's purse and shot Pender three times, who eventually died in a hospital. According to relatives, Pough never managed to get over the fact that he had killed his friend. Pough was initially charged with murder, though the charge was later reduced to manslaughter. In the end, he pleaded guilty to aggravated assault and was sentenced to five years probation, but the judgment of his guilt was withheld by the court subject to the successful completion of probation. It was also ruled that Pough should never be allowed to own a gun due to his violent behavior in the past, though this was never forwarded to police. As a result, Pough was not considered a felon and therefore was able to purchase several handguns, among them the Röhm RG-31 .38-caliber revolver he later used to commit suicide, which was registered with the police on June 4, 1979. In 1977, Pough appeared twice in court for charges of bad debt, and there was also an outstanding warrant for his arrest in a 1982 employment compensation fraud case.

Life prior to the shootings
In December 1988, Pough traded his old car for a 1988 Pontiac Grand Am, though he soon had difficulties to make his payments. As a result, the car was voluntarily repossessed by the General Motors Acceptance Corporation (GMAC) in January 1990. He received a bill for $6,394 (around $13,200 as of 2021) of outstanding fees in March, and again on April 6, which was the last contact between him and the office. About two months prior to the shootings, Pough purchased a Universal Brand M1 carbine at a local pawnshop.

Pough was living in a rundown duplex in Jacksonville's Northwest Quadrant at the time. He was known by his neighbors as a quiet and nice man who kept a regular and fixed schedule, but also as someone who would become angry fairly quickly and get engaged in enraged conversations, especially in matters concerning money and his car. Relatives described him as a recluse with no friends. After the death of his mother three years prior to the shootings, Pough was said to have emotionally changed for the worse, saying that he had nothing left to live for and arguing that he would "take someone with him when he leaves this world". Frequently, he had violent outbursts, which were directed against his wife, Theresa, and twice he threatened her by putting a gun to her head. In January 1990, they separated, as Theresa feared for her safety, and on March 2, she was granted an injunction that disallowed Pough to get in contact with her for a year. As a consequence, he withdrew even more and rarely socialized.

The 1990 killing spree

First attacks
Pough started his killing spree in the night of June 17, 1990, at about 12:50 a.m. Armed with his blanket-wrapped M1 Carbine and not far from his home, he walked up to a group of men standing at a street corner in the Northwest section of Jacksonville, and killed Louis Carl Bacon with two shots in the chest before fleeing. A couple of minutes later, he attacked Doretta Drake who was chatting with two other women in a vacant parking lot just two blocks from the first crime scene. After hitting Drake with his car, throwing her on the sidewalk, Pough stepped out of his Buick and killed her with a single shot to the head before driving away.

A short time later, Pough also shot and wounded two youths, 17 and 18 years of age, after asking them for directions. Later, on the morning of June 18, Pough entered a convenience store, threatened the clerk with a pistol and, stating that he didn't have anything to lose, demanded all of the money in the register. After getting the money, he left.

GMAC shooting
After robbing the convenience store, he visited his mother's grave one last time and then called his supervisor to state that he wouldn't be coming to work because he had something else to do. At about 10:44 a.m., Pough parked his car at the GMAC office located at 7870 Baymeadows Way in Jacksonville. He entered the building through the front door, armed with his M1 Carbine, a Röhm RG-31 .38-caliber revolver, several loaded magazines, and ammunition packed in his pockets. Without saying a word he immediately began shooting with the M1 Carbine at two customers at the front counter, killing Julia Burgess and wounding David Hendrix with four shots. Walking through the open office he then systematically moved from desk to desk and shot at the GMAC workers, deliberately aiming at those hiding under their desks.

Drew Woods was the first to be shot at his desk, followed by Cynthia Perry and Barbara Holland nearby, as well as Phyllis Griggs, who was injured. When the GMAC employees realized what was going on, many of them escaped through a back door of the building while Pough started shooting at those ducking for cover. GMAC employees Janice David, Sharon Hall, Jewell Belote, Lee Simonton, Denise Highfill, Ron Echevarria, and Nancy Dill were also shot. Pough then put the .38-caliber revolver to his head and committed suicide. In just under two minutes Pough had fired at the least 28 rounds from his carbine; hitting 11 of the 85 workers in the office, as well as the two customers. Six of his victims died at the scene, while another three died at hospital, the last being Jewell Belote, who succumbed to her wounds nine days after the shooting.

When searching Pough's car police recovered a loaded 9mm semi-automatic machine pistol, two magazines, and ammunition, as well as twelve pieces of nylon rope, each having a length of 24 inches, which led police to the assumption that Pough initially might have intended to take hostages. When police arrived at Pough's home, it had been ransacked.  They found a calendar with two dates circled in red: May 8, the day he killed his friend Pender, and June 18.

Victims

Killed
May 8, 1971
• David Lee Pender, 27
June 17, 1990
Louis Carl Bacon, 39
Doretta Drake, 30

June 18, 1990
Julia White Burgess, 42, customer
Drew Woods, 38
Cynthia L. Perry, 30
Barbara Duckwall Holland, 45
Janice David, 40
Sharon Louise Hall, 45
Jewell Belote, 50, died on June 27
Lee Simonton, 33
Denise Sapp Highfill, 36

Wounded
June 17, 1990
Unidentified teenager, 17
Unidentified teenager, 18

June 18, 1990
David Hendrix, 25, customer
Phyllis Griggs
Ron Echevarria
Nancy Dill

See also
 List of rampage killers in the United States
 Gun violence in the United States
 Mass shootings in the United States

References

External links

NOVA Responses in 1990
A deadly day in Jacksonville

10th Death in Office Shooting, The New York Times (June 28, 1990)
Death Toll Reaches 10 In Loan Office Killings, The Washington Post (June 28, 1990)
City tires to make sense of slaughter, St. Petersburg Times (June 21, 1990)
Funerals held for six GMAC shooting victims, St. Petersburg Times (June 22, 1990)
GMAC moves its offices from site of rampage, St. Petersburg Times (June 27, 1990)
10th GMAC victim dies, St. Petersburg Times (June 28, 1990)
Massacre memories remain, The Prescott Courier (June 17, 1991)
Gunman's death toll reaches 8, The Prescott Courier (June 19, 1990)
Office shootings stir gun control debate, The Prescott Courier (June 20, 1990)
Florida police seek rampage clues, Deseret News (June 19, 1990)
911 tape tells horror of Florida massacre, Deseret News (June 20, 1990)
Nine dead in bloody rampage, Ocala Star-Banner (June 19, 1990)
Massacre sparks calls for assault gun ban, Ocala Star-Banner (June 20, 1990)
Investigators still unsure of motive for GMAC massacre, Ocala Star-Banner (June 21, 1990)
Governor leads service for victims of massacre, Ocala Star-Banner (June 23, 1990)
Lines again drawn on assault guns, Ocala Star-Banner (June 24, 1990)
Killer's motives unknown, Ocala Star-Banner (June 25, 1990)
Woman dies, ninth victim of gunman, Ocala Star-Banner (June 28, 1990)
Woman honored for life-saving role, Ocala Star-Banner (July 13, 1990)
Another victim dies from gunshots, Spokane Chronicle (June 28, 1990)
Eight slain in Florida massacre, The Milwaukee Sentinel (June 19, 1990)
Tapes reveal terror during massacre, The Milwaukee Sentinel (June 20, 1990)
"Loaded for war", The Free Lance–Star (June 19, 1990)
Eight people killed in office massacre, Eugene Register-Guard (June 19, 1990)
Police blame same gunman for shootings, Eugene Register-Guard (June 20, 1990)
Jacksonville killing spree began over weekend, police say, Daily News of Kingsport (June 21, 1990)
Florida killer had criminal past, police widen investigation, Daily News of Kingsport (June 22, 1990)
Silent killer kills 10 people, himself in two days, Mohave Daily Miner (June 19, 1990)
Tapes tell terror of shooting spree, The News (June 20, 1990)
Gunman kills 8; may have slain others, Ludington Daily News (June 19, 1990)
Gunman opens fire, kills nine in Florida, Wilmington Morning Star (June 19, 1990)
Services held for shooting victims, The Gainesville Sun (June 22, 1990)
Keystone pays respect to victims, The Gainesville Sun (June 23, 1990)
GMAC massacre renews state assault wepaons debate, The Gainesville Sun (June 24, 1990)
Victims families urged to go forward, The News (June 24, 1990)
Gunman blasts his way through office, The Spokesman-Review (June 19, 1990)

1948 births
1990 in Florida
1990 mass shootings in the United States
1990 murders in the United States
1990 suicides
20th century in Jacksonville, Florida
American mass murderers
American spree killers
Attacks in the United States in 1990
Mass murder in 1990
Mass shootings in the United States
Murder–suicides in Florida
People from Jacksonville, Florida
Suicides by firearm in Florida